This is a list of Native American reservations in the U.S. state of Arizona.

List of reservations

See also
 Indigenous peoples of Arizona
 Fort Apache Indian Reservation
 List of federally recognized tribes in Arizona
 List of cities and towns in Arizona
 List of counties in Arizona

References

 
Indian Reservations
Indian reservations
Indian reservations, Arizona